Claim Dedications (stylized as claim dedications) is the second and final album by johnboy, released on August 29, 1994 through Trance Syndicate.

Track listing

Personnel 
Steve Albini – production, engineering
Tony Bice – bass guitar, vocals
Jason Meade – drums
Barry Stone – guitar, vocals, cover - painting component - oil on glass mirror

References

External links 
 

1994 albums
Albums produced by Steve Albini
Trance Syndicate albums